The men's coxless pair (M2-) competition at the 1984 Summer Olympics took place at Lake Casitas in Ventura County, California, United States. It was held from 30 July to 5 August and the outcome was wide open due to the Eastern Bloc boycott and thus the absence of the dominating team from East Germany. The event was won by the team from Romania.

Background
East Germany had won the coxless pair competition at every Summer Olympics since the 1968 Summer Olympics in Mexico, and they were the reigning world champion. The Soviet Union had won silver at the last Summer Olympics in this event, had won the 1981 World Rowing Championships, and had won silver in 1983. With both nations absent due to the Eastern Bloc boycott, the only competing nation that had won recent world championships was Norway, which had won the title in 1982. The competition was thus regarded as wide open.

Previous M2- competitions

Results

Heats
The heats of the opening round were rowed on 31 July. The first three of every heat would progress to the semi-finals, whilst the other teams would go to the repechage.

Heat 1

Heat 2

Heat 3

Repechage
The repechage was rowed on 1 August. The first three would progress to the semi-finals, whilst the other two teams were eliminated.

The Swiss team changed seats in the repechage and then maintained the new configuration for the rest of the competition.

Semi-finals
The semi-finals were rowed on 2 August. The first three would progress to the A final, whilst the other teams would go to the B final.

Heat 1
The Germans and the Dutch swapped seats in their semi-final and maintained the new configuration in their finals.

Heat 2

Finals

B final
The B final was rowed on 3 August.

A final
The A final was rowed on 5 August. Spain was a surprise medallist, and as of 2022, their silver medal is the only Olympic rowing medal that the nation has ever won.

Notes

References 
 
Volume 1 Part 1
Volume 1 Part 2
Volume 1 Part 3
 
Volume 2 Part 1
Volume 2 Part 2
Volume 2 Part 3 (page 469 onwards)

Men's coxless pair
Men's events at the 1984 Summer Olympics